SIIMA Award for Best Supporting Actor – Telugu is presented by Vibri media group as part of its annual South Indian International Movie Awards, for the best acting done by an actor in a supporting role in Telugu films. The award was first given in 2012 for films released in 2011. Rajendra Prasad is the most nominated with 5 nominations and most awarded with three wins.

Superlatives

Winners

Nominations 

 2011: Prakash Raj – Dookudu
 Akkineni Nageshwara Rao – Sri Rama Rajyam
 Ashish Vidyarthi – Ala Modalaindi
 Srihari – Aha Naa Pellanta
 Baby Annie – Rajanna
 2012: Rajendra Prasad – Julayi
 Prakash Raj – Dhamarukam
 Kota Srinivasa Rao – Krishnam Vande Jagadgurum
 Ajay – Ishq
 Nassar – Businessman
 2013: Sunil – Tadakha
 Prakash Raj – Seethamma Vakitlo Sirimalle Chettu
 Sathyaraj – Mirchi
 Madhunandan – Gunde Jaari Gallanthayyinde
 Boman Irani – Attarintiki Daredi
 2014: Srinivas Avasarala – Oohalu Gusagusalade
 Srikanth – Govindudu Andarivadele
 Ajay – Dikkulu Choodaku Ramayya
 Prakash Raj – Govindudu Andarivadele
 Srinivasa Reddy – Geethanjali
 2015: Rajendra Prasad – Srimanthudu
 Jagapati Babu – Srimanthudu
 Posani Krishna Murali – Temper
 Sathyaraj – Baahubali: The Beginning
 Upendra – S/O Satyamurthy
 2016: Srikanth – Sarrainodu
 Mohanlal – Janatha Garage
 Nara Rohit – Appatlo Okadundevadu
 Rajendra Prasad – Supreme
 Satyam Rajesh – Kshanam
 2017: Aadhi Pinisetty – Ninnu Kori
 Kay Kay Menon – Ghazi
 Prakash Raj – Sathamanam Bhavati
 Sathyaraj – Baahubali 2: The Conclusion
 Sree Vishnu – Vunnadhi Okate Zindagi
 2018: Rajendra Prasad – Mahanati
 Aadhi Pinisetty – Rangasthalam
 Murali Sharma – Vijetha
 Naresh – Sammohanam
 Ramki – RX 100
 2019: Allari Naresh – Maharshi
 Rao Ramesh – Prati Roju Pandage
 Rajendra Prasad – Oh! Baby
 Atharvaa – Gaddalakonda Ganesh
 Suhas – Majili
2020: Murali Sharma – Ala Vaikunthapurramuloo
Rajendra Prasad – Sarileru Neekevvaru
Naresh – Uma Maheswara Ugra Roopasya
Rao Ramesh – Solo Brathuke So Better
Thiruveer – Palasa 1978
2021: Jagadeesh Prathap Bandari – Pushpa: The Rise
 Rahul Ramakrishna – Jathi Ratnalu
 Sai Kumar – SR Kalyanamandapam
 Jagapathi Babu – Maha Samudram
 Priyadarshi – Jathi Ratnalu

See also 

 Tollywood

References 

South Indian International Movie Awards
South Indian International Movie Awards winners